The following is a list of Grammy Awards winners and nominees from Brazil, including special awards.

References

Brazilian
 Grammy
Grammy
Grammy